The East African School of Media Studies is an institution providing high level, technology-based training in media-related courses in East Africa.

The school, established in 2003 by Donald Giesen and based in Nairobi, Kenya, has the stated goal of providing students with professional training that will enable them to expand and improve the media industry in East Africa. Currently, the school offers two-year diploma courses in mass communication, broadcast journalism, and television and video production.

The school equips students with top of the cut journalistic skills equipping them with high-profile collection equipment that they are most likely to encounter in their future jobs. Students pursuing a course in the college are allowed to attend classes of another course at their own convenience at no extra cost. However, this will not amount to graduation of the "extra course". The school has produced professionals all over the country and the continent, local media houses have benefited from the experienced presence of news anchors like Mwanaisha Chidzuga, and reporters like Damaris Kitavi, Victor Ogalle, and Kofa Mrenje.

Universities and colleges in Kenya
Education in Nairobi
Educational institutions established in 2003
2003 establishments in Kenya